The International Behavioural and Neural Genetics Society (IBANGS) is a learned society that was founded in 1996. The goal of IBANGS is "promote and facilitate the growth of research in the field of neural behavioral genetics".

Profile

Mission
The IBANGS mission statement is to promote the field of neurobehavioural genetics by:
 organizing annual meetings to promote excellence in research on behavioural and neural genetics
 publishing a scholarly journal, Genes, Brain and Behavior in collaboration with Wiley-Blackwell

Awards
Each year IBANGS recognizes top scientists in the field of neurobehavioral genetics with:

The IBANGS Distinguished Investigator Award for distinguished lifetime contributions to behavioral neurogenetics
The IBANGS Young Scientist Award for promising young scientists
Travel Awards to attend an IBANGS Annual Meeting for students, postdocs, and junior faculty, financed by a meeting grant from the National Institute on Alcohol Abuse and Alcoholism

A Distinguished Service Award for exceptional contributions to the field is given on a more irregular basis and  has been awarded only three times, to Benson Ginsburg (2001), Wim Crusio (2011), and John C. Crabbe (2015).

History
IBANGS was founded in 1996 as the European Behavioural and Neural Genetics Society, with Hans-Peter Lipp as its founding president. The name and scope of EBANGS were changed to "International" at the first meeting of the society in Orléans, France in 1997. IBANGS is a founding member of the Federation of European Neuroscience Societies.

The current president is Judy Grisel (2021-2022). Previous presidents have been:

References

External links

Genetics organizations
Behavioral neuroscience
Neuroscience organizations
Scientific organizations established in 1996
Behavioural genetics societies
International scientific organizations